Tatiana Miloserdova (born 9 January 1960) is a Russian-born equestrian, who has been representing Italy since 2019. She competed in the individual dressage event at the 2008 Summer Olympics.

References

External links
 

1960 births
Living people
Italian female equestrians
Russian female equestrians
Olympic equestrians of Russia
Equestrians at the 2008 Summer Olympics
Sportspeople from Moscow